There is another Dewey Mountain in Chittenden County, Vermont

Dewey Mountain is a  mountain in Franklin County, New York just south of the village of Saranac Lake. A hill that slopes down to Lake Flower and is a shoulder of Dewey Mountain has been called Blood Hill, Maple Hill, or sometimes Reservoir Hill. It is one of three small mountains surrounding Saranac Lake: the others are Baker Mountain and Mount Pisgah. It was originally called Ring Hill. Kiwassa Lake Road runs along the eastern side of the hill and of a shoulder of Dewey Mountain.  The Dewey Mountain Recreation Center operates a ski center on the west side of the mountain.
In the 1920s weekly ski meets were held consisting of ski jumping followed by a cross-country race—early Nordic combined. Competitors would come from around New England, New York City and Montreal. One of the jumps was on Blood Hill, an eastern shoulder of Dewey. In the 1940s there was a downhill ski area on the west side of the mountain served by a rope tow.

References

Mountains of Franklin County, New York